Between Heaven and Earth is a 1942 German historical drama film directed by Harald Braun and starring Werner Krauss, Gisela Uhlen and Wolfgang Lukschy. It is based on the 1856 novel of the same title by Otto Ludwig which had previously been made into a 1934 film by Bavaria Film.

The film's sets were designed by the art director Walter Haag. It was shot at the Tempelhof Studios in Berlin and on location in the Rhineland.

Cast

References

Bibliography 
 Goble, Alan. The Complete Index to Literary Sources in Film. Walter de Gruyter, 1999.

External links

1942 films
Films of Nazi Germany
1940s German-language films
Films directed by Harald Braun
UFA GmbH films
Films set in the 1870s
1940s historical drama films
German historical drama films
Films based on German novels
Films shot at Tempelhof Studios
German black-and-white films
1942 drama films
Remakes of German films
1940s German films